is a Japanese singer-songwriter and former member of the group Aido. He is a part of Sony Music Japan's SME Records division. He was born in Takehara City in Hiroshima Prefecture, and graduated from Kuremitsuta High School (where he was a member of the baseball team). He attended Kanagawa University, where he studied law, but left the school before graduating.

In 1975, he made his professional debut as the drummer of the band Aido. Sunglasses have been his trademark ever since his debut, and he has never performed live without sunglasses of some sort (most commonly Ray-Ban Aviator or Ray-Ban Wayfarer). His solo debut came in 1976 with the album Umareta Tokoro o Tōku Hanarete. Though his exposure in the media has always been extremely low, relative to many performers with similar levels of mainstream popularity, he has acquired his many fans over the years through his steady series of live performances. Many of his early songs expressed his skepticism about how one should live their life. In addition to his well-known ballads, he was strongly influenced by his father's experience as a victim of radiation poisoning following the atomic bombing of Hiroshima in 1945, and many of his songs have a very strong protest song tone, likely the most of any "big name" singer in Japan.

He has written music for many other artists, including Momoe Yamaguchi, and Akiko Wada. He is affectionately referred to as "Hamasho" by many of his fans.

Discography

Singles released within Aido

Singles

Albums

External links 
  Official website
  Artist page on Sony Music Online Japan website

1952 births
Living people
20th-century Japanese male singers
21st-century Japanese male singers
Japanese male singer-songwriters
Japanese male rock singers
Kanagawa University alumni
Musicians from Hiroshima Prefecture
Sony Music Entertainment Japan artists